Robert Edmunds may refer to:

 Robert H. Edmunds Jr. (born 1949), North Carolina judge
 R. H. Edmunds (Robert Henry Edmunds, 1834–1917), surveyor, explorer and public servant in South Australia

See also
 Robert Edmonds (disambiguation)